Ammerstol is a village, part of the municipality of Krimpenerwaard in the Netherlands.

Between 1817 and 1985, Ammerstol was an independent municipality. Until 2015, it was part of Bergambacht.

Ammerstol has two listed Rijksmonuments: the 17th century inventory of its Reformed Church (itself built during 1880-81), and a thatched-roof farmhouse.

References

Former municipalities of South Holland
Populated places in South Holland
Krimpenerwaard